Lanto may refer to:

 Elin Lanto (born 1984), Swedish singer
 Evelyn Lanto, also known as Carrie Keranen
 Lanto Griffin (born 1988), American golfer
 Lanto Rambeasimbola, also known as Augustin Rabeasimbola
 Lanto Sheridan (born 1988), British polo player
 Hajanirina Lanto Ramaherijaona, Malagasy politician

See also
 Lantos
 Lantto